The 20th season of Arthur began broadcast on PBS in the United States on October 10, 2016, and finished on June 1, 2017. In this season, Oasis Animation took over animation from 9 Story Media Group.

Christian Distefano takes over the voice for D.W., replacing Andrew Dayton. Distefano previously voiced James in Seasons 18 and 19. Jacob Ursomarzo replaced William Healy as Arthur, and Samuel Faraci and Devan Cohen replaced Jacob Ewaniuk and Jake Sim as Timmy and Tommy Tibble.

Episodes

References

2016 American television seasons
2017 American television seasons
Arthur (TV series) seasons
2016 Canadian television seasons